"My Girl (Gone, Gone, Gone)" is a song that was performed by the Canadian group Chilliwack. Co-written by bandmembers Brian MacLeod and Bill Henderson, it was released on the band's 1981 album Wanna Be a Star.

In Canada, the song spent four weeks at number 3. In the United States, it reached number 22 on the Billboard Hot 100.

Background
In their native Canada, writers MacLeod and Henderson were nominated for the Juno Award for 1982 Composer of the Year, as well as Single of the Year for "My Girl (Gone, Gone, Gone).". In January 2019, the song became certified Platinum (in excess of 100,000 copies sold) as a single in Canada.

Chart performance

Weekly charts

Year-end charts

In popular culture
On the April 23, 1982 episode of the sketch comedy TV series SCTV during the skit "Pre-Teen World Telethon," the fictional adolescent garage band The Recess Monkeys, as performed by Stephan Seely (John Candy) on drums and backing vocals; Paul Rey (Eugene Levy) on guitar, backing vocals, and tambourine and Steve Applebaum (Rick Moranis) on guitar and lead vocals; do a very amateurish cover of the song.

References

External links
 

1981 singles
1981 songs
Chilliwack (band) songs
Millennium Records singles
Songs about loneliness
Torch songs